Charles Wilkinson is a Canadian documentary filmmaker and film and television director. He is best known for making documentaries that touch on environmental issues. These include Haida Modern, Vancouver: No Fixed Address, Haida Gwaii: On the Edge of the World, Oil Sands Karaoke, and Peace Out. All five films premiered at Hot Docs International Documentary Festival, and have gone on to win awards at Hot Docs, the Vancouver International Film Festival, le Festival International du Film sur l'Art - Artfifa, the DGC Awards, the Leo Awards and the Yorkton Film Festival. Before moving into documentaries, Wilkinson worked for many years in dramatic television series and on feature films. His directing credits include such TV series as The Highlander, The Immortal, So Weird, Dead Man's Gun, Road to Avonlea and The Beachcombers, the feature films My Kind of Town, Max, Blood Clan and Breach of Trust, and the TV movie Heart of the Storm. As a preteen, he was one of the original performers in the Calgary Safety Roundup, paired with his brother Billy as kid cowboy singers. "We sang both kinds - country and western."

References

External links 
 Official Site

Canadian documentary film directors
Canadian documentary film producers
Canadian television directors
Cinema of British Columbia
Living people
Film directors from Calgary
Year of birth missing (living people)